Han Cheng (died 206 BC), also known as Han Wang Cheng in some Chinese historical texts, was a ruler of the Kingdom of Hán of the Eighteen Kingdoms during the Chu–Han Contention, an interregnum between the Qin and Han dynasties of China.

Biography
Han Cheng was a descendant of the royal family of the Hán state of the Seven Warring States. He lived as a commoner during the Qin dynasty after his native state was conquered by the Qin state in 230 BC.

In 209 BC, when uprisings occurred throughout China to overthrow the Qin Empire, Han Cheng joined Xiang Liang's rebel force in the hope of reviving his native state. Along the way, he met Zhang Liang, a descendant of a bureaucratic family from the former Hán state. Zhang Liang succeeded in persuading Xiang Liang to restore the former Hán state and Han Cheng was appointed as its ruler with Zhang Liang serving as his chancellor. Xiang Liang also provided some troops to Han Cheng and allowed him to attack the Qin garrisons at Yingchuan (in present-day Henan).

After the fall of the Qin Empire in 206 BC, Xiang Yu divided the former Qin territories into the Eighteen Kingdoms. Han Cheng was appointed as the King of Hán. Months later, Xiang Yu had Han Cheng killed and replaced with Zheng Chang.

References
 

Chu–Han contention people
Chinese kings
206 BC deaths
Year of birth unknown